Iurii Shestak (Шестак Юрій Сергійович; born April 26, 1993) is a Ukrainian amateur boxer in the lightweight division.

He is 2017 European champion after winning the title in Kharkiv.

He is a two-time Ukrainian champion: 2013, 2016.

References

1993 births
Living people
Ukrainian male boxers
European Games competitors for Ukraine
Boxers at the 2015 European Games
Boxers at the 2019 European Games
Lightweight boxers
21st-century Ukrainian people